Helen MacKellar (February 13, 1895 – August 5, 1966) was an American actress.

Born in Detroit, Michigan, MacKeller's ancestry was Scottish and French-Canadian. She studied acting in Chicago and Spokane. Her stage debut came in Spokane in The Whirl of the Town, a musical comedy, when she was 14. She went on to perform in vaudeville and in repertory theatre with the Valencia Stock Company in Los Angeles. Her first acting in the eastern United States was with the Poli Stock Company in New Haven.

MacKellar's film debut came in The Past of Mary Holmes. She also appeared in Two Against the World, Draegerman Courage, The Case of the Stuttering Bishop, Crime School, Little Tough Guy, Barefoot Boy, Valley of the Giants, Disbarred, Boy Slaves, Bad Boy, Northwest Passage, Dark Command, Cheers for Miss Bishop, The Great Mr. Nobody, The Great Train Robbery, Gangs of Sonora, Down Mexico Way, The Man Who Returned to Life, Street of Chance, The Sundown Kid, The Powers Girl and Silver Spurs, among others.

MacKellar's Broadway credits included Dear Ruth (1944), Bloody Laughter (1931), Through the Night (1930), Romancin' Round (1927), Open House (1925), The Mud Turtle (1925), A Good Bad Woman (1925), The Desert Flower (1924), The Masked Woman (1922), The Shadow (1922), Bought and Paid For (1921), Back Pay (1921), The Storm (1919), The Unknown Purple (1918), Major Pendennis (1916), and Seven Chances (1916).

MacKellar was married to George McQuarrie. She died in New York City.

Filmography

References

External links
 
 Helen Mackellar at IBDb.com

1895 births
1966 deaths
20th-century American actresses
American film actresses
American stage actresses